Today Tonight was an Irish news and current affairs programme noted for its in-depth analysis, robust cross-examination of senior politicians and investigative reporting.  The programme was broadcast on RTÉ One for the first time on Monday 6 October 1980.

Brian Farrell, Barry Cowan and Olivia O'Leary were the three original presenters.  They were subsequently joined by others such as Pat Cox, John Bowman and Pat Kenny.  All of these presenters later went on to hold other positions in RTÉ Television.  Today Tonight was broadcast from Monday to Thursday on RTÉ One after the main evening news and restored the station's reputation for current affairs broadcasting following the demise of 7 Days in 1976.  The last edition of the programme was broadcast on 27 August 1992 and was replaced by Prime Time.

It won a number of Jacob's Awards.

An in-depth report into the 14 February 1981 Stardust fire broadcast by Today Tonight on 16 February 1981 led to a senior adviser of Taoiseach Charles Haughey accusing RTÉ of undermining the Stardust Tribunal.

The series will be available on RTE Player Christmas 2021 to celebrate 60 Years Of Television.

References

1982 Irish television series debuts
1992 Irish television series endings
1980s Irish television series
1990s Irish television series
Irish television news shows
RTÉ original programming